Sudesi is a 2006 Indian Tamil language political action film directed by Jeppy A. Y. It stars Vijayakanth and Ashima Bhalla. It was later dubbed in Hindi as Mr. Hindustani.

Plot
After the death of the Chief Minister of Tamil Nadu Ganapathy (V. S. Raghavan), the ruling party chooses Narayanan (Sayaji Shinde), a corrupt politician and ex-rowdy, as their new party leader and the Chief Minister of Tamil Nadu. Ponnusamy (Alex), a party member who wants to become the chief minister, tries to stop it but Narayanan plants a bomb in his car and Ponnusamy dies. Narayanan's right-hand man is Ragavachari (Krishna) and advises him on all matters whereas the minister Ramasamy hates Ragavachari and wants to become Narayanan's right-hand man.

Sudesi (Vijayakanth) is a jobless man who has a master's degree in political science and lives with his mother (Sangeetha) in the city. For the village festival, Sudesi returns to his village and his relative Selvi (Ashima Bhalla) who loves him tries to win his heart. Back to the city, Sudesi's servant Kamala informs Sudesi that her son went missing and his dead body is later found in a drain by the police. Sudesi finds out the culprit: a school teacher (Thalaivasal Vijay). That day, the school teacher sent the schoolboy Ganesh to his house for doing housework. At the police station, the police inspector (Mansoor Ali Khan) promises Sudesi that the school teacher will be in jail for a long time. Later that day, the police inspector Sudesi receives bribes from the school teacher and Sudesi takes the issue to the court.

One day, a beggar steals the handbag of Shruti (Shruti Malhotra) who is Ragavachari's mistress on the street and Sudesi goes after him. Ragavachari then kills Shruti for her inadvertence while Sudesi brings the handbag to his house. With his henchmen, Ragavachari meets Sudesi in his house and plants a bomb to destroy all the evidence. The bomb explodes killing his mother and an injured Sudesi is admitted to the hospital. At the hospital, Selvi brings him the handbag she had taken with her that day and he finds a CD inside. Sudesi then absconds. The private detective Thilak (Manoj K. Jayan) is assigned by Raghavachari to find Sudesi and the CD.

Thilak eventually finds him and Sudesi shows him the video in the CD. The video shows Narayanan killing the chief minister Ganapathy in the hospital and it was Ragavachari who recorded it with a hidden camera to blackmail Narayanan later. Thilak surprisingly decides to support Sudesi. Sudesi and Thilak then kidnap Raghavachari. Sudesi starts to blackmail Narayanan using the CD and uses him effectively for the betterment of society. Narayanan gets praised by the public for his good work and he wins the Legislative Assembly election hands down. Narayanan then thanks Sudesi for changing him into a good politician and he will continue his work under Sudesi's guidance.

Cast

Vijayakanth as Sudesi
Ashima Bhalla as Selvi
M. N. Nambiar as Sudesi's grandfather
Sayaji Shinde as Narayanan
Karunas as Ramesh
Livingston as Ramasamy
Mansoor Ali Khan as Police inspector
Manoj K. Jayan as Thilak
Krishna as Raghavachari
Shruti Malhotra as Shruti
Thalaivasal Vijay as Teacher
Alex as Ponnusamy
Ilavarasu as Parotta master
Sangeetha as Sudesi's mother
Kalairani as Kamala
Srilatha as Professor's wife
Vijay Krishnaraj as Collector
Srikanth as Judge
V. S. Raghavan as Ganapathy
Besant Ravi as Naga
Amjad Khan as Rowdy
Halwa Vasu as Vasu
Madhan Bob as Dr. Kannadasan
Mayilsamy as Drunkard
Muthukaalai as Beggar
Nellai Siva as Pharmacist
Bava Lakshmanan
Krishnamoorthy as Villager
Kottai Perumal as Swamy
Master Karthik as Ganesh
Baby Uma Rani as Professor's daughter
Ajay Rathnam as Government officer
Vijay Easwaran as Eswaran
Achamillai Gopi as Dr. Gopi
Velmurugan as Villager
Brinda Parekh in a special appearance

Soundtrack
Music was composed by Srikanth Deva.

Reception
Indiaglitz said, "Though the movie is aimed at taking to masses the political agenda of Vijayakanth, debutant director Jeppy A Y deserves some credit for making it interesting with mix of commercial elements like item numbers and stunt sequences. The likes of Ashima, playing his ladylove, and Shayaji Shinde have done a decent job. Vijayakanth as usual excels in stunt sequences. Srikanth Deva's musical score fails to impress. Without hurting anybody's sentiments, Vijayakanth seems to have sent a strong political message. Though Sudesi resembles Mudhalvan (1999) at few places, Vijayakanth seems to have got his first act right, but still has a lot of work to do with elections around".

References

External links 
 

2006 films
2000s Tamil-language films
Films scored by Srikanth Deva